Adrien Decourcelle (28 October 1821 – 6 August 1892) was a 19th-century French writer and playwright.

Pierre-Henri-Adrien Decourcelle wrote about 70 plays between 1845 and 1855, comedies and Comédie en vaudeville written most of the time in collaboration with Théodore Barrière. He was also a successful chansonnier.

In 1851 he married Caroline Lambert, a niece of Adolphe d'Ennery. His son was Pierre Decourcelle (1856-1926), a playwright, novelist, president of the Société des gens de lettres and commandeur of the Légion d'honneur. Pierre Decourcelle was involved in legal disputes following Ennery's death in 1899.

Adrien Decourcelle is buried at Père Lachaise Cemetery in the 20th arrondissement of Paris (7th division).

Selected works 
1848: Un vilain monsieur, play with Théodore Barrière, Théâtre des Variétés
1850: Les Petits Moyens, play with Eugène Labiche and Gustave Lemoine, Théâtre du Gymnase
1895: La Belle Épicière, operetta with Henri Kéroul, music by Louis Varney, Théâtre des Bouffes-Parisiens

Distinctions 
 Chevalier of the Légion d'honneur

References

Bibliography 
 Domenico Gabrielli, Dictionnaire historique du cimetière du Père-Lachaise (XVIIIe – XIXe siècles), Paris, éd. de l'Amateur, 2002, .
 Revue d'art dramatique, tome 27, 1892, (p. 248).

External links 
 Adrien Decourcelle sur artlyriquefr.fr
 Adrien Decourcelle on 
 

19th-century French dramatists and playwrights
French chansonniers
People from Montdidier, Somme
1821 births
1892 deaths
Burials at Père Lachaise Cemetery